= Pensions in Malta =

Aspect of economic policy in Malta

The pension scheme in Malta is relatively new due to the nature of having gained independence from the United Kingdom on 21 September 1964 and became a republic on 13 December 1974. It also has the smallest economy in the eurozone which explains why Malta very recently enacted the Retirement Pensions Act of 2015. Since Malta has been a member of the European Union since May 1, 2004, they are to uphold the values of The European Pillar of Social Rights. Though, ultimately pension policy and the regulation of it is held at the national level. There are different types of retirement schemes citizens of Malta qualify for. The first being an occupational retirement scheme in that this plan is established either for or by an employer for associated employees. The second is a personal retirement scheme in which the individual has contributed to the plan rather than an employer.

The majority of the population is employed in the manufacturing and service sector with a unionized public sector. This results in the occupational retirement scheme being the most popular. Currently only 20.51% of Malta's current population as of 2018 is 65 years of age or old qualifying for pension schemes. This has led to Malta dedicating only 7.6% relative of its GDP to expenditure on pensions as of 2015.
